Amelia Gere Mason (1831–1923) was an American writer.

Mason née Gere was born on September 23, 1831 in Northampton, Massachusetts. She was married to Alvin A. Mason. Gere wrote for the Atlantic Monthly magazine. She was the author of The Women of the French Salons (1891) and Woman in the Golden Ages (1901). Women of the French Salons included chapters on Madame du Deffand, Mademoiselle de Lespinasse, Madame Geoffrin, Madame d'Épinay, Madame Roland, Madame Necker, Madame de Staël, Madame Récamier, Madame de Sévigné, and Madame Vigée Le Brun.

Mason died in Chicago, Illinois on August 11, 1923.

References

External links

1831 births
1923 deaths
American writers
American women writers